The 1896–97 season was Blackpool F.C.'s debut season in the Football League. They competed in the sixteen-team Division Two, then the second tier of English football, finishing eighth.

Jack Parkinson was the club's top scorer, with fifteen goals to his name. Tommy Bowman, William Douglas and Bob Norris were ever-present during the club's 30 league games.

Season review
Blackpool's first game in the Football League took place on 5 September 1896, at Lincoln City's Sincil Bank. The visitors' starting eleven that day was: William Douglas, Henry Parr (captain), Tommy Bowman, Alex Stuart, Harry Stirzaker, Bob Norris, John Clarkin, Sam Donnelly, Jack Parkinson, Bob Parkinson and Charlie Mount. Mount scored Blackpool's first League goal, but they slipped to a 3–1 defeat.

A week later, Blackpool travelled to Darwen and chalked up their first victory, 3–2.

On 19 September, Burton Wanderers were the first visitors to Raikes Hall for a Football League game, and they returned whence they came with a 5–0 defeat behind them.

For the final game of September, the Seasiders hosted Manchester City. The match finished 2–2.

Another road trip ensued, on 3 October, to Leicester Fosse. The Midlanders took both points with a 2–1 victory.

After a fortnight's break, Blackpool welcomed North-West neighbours Newton Heath to Raikes Hall. The home side ran out 4–2 winners.

The following week, at Burton Swifts, Blackpool drew 2–2.

November began with a trip to Manchester City. The host won 4–2.

Lincoln City travelled to the Lancashire coast on 14 November, and Blackpool recorded their first win for a month. Bob Birkett, on his debut and in his only appearance of the season, scored Blackpool's first goal in a 3–1 victory.

Two weeks later, Notts County were the visitors, and Blackpool were the victors for the second consecutive game, this time with a 3–2 result.

Blackpool didn't play again until a 19 December visit to Woolwich Arsenal. They lost 4–2.

On Boxing Day, Blackpool travelled to Newton Heath and lost 2–0 in what appears to be, at around 10,000, the largest crowd of the season in a game involving Blackpool.

1897 began with a New Year's Day victory at home to Grimsby Town.

On 4 January, Woolwich Arsenal made the trip up from London. They returned to the capital with a point after a 1–1 draw.

Twelve days later, Blackpool travelled north-east to Newcastle United. The Magpies won 4–1.

On 23 January, Small Heath were the visitors to Raikes Hall. They won 3–1.

A third consecutive defeat occurred at Loughborough at the end of the month. The match ended 1–4.

After another break, Blackpool hosted Walsall on 13 February and chalked up their first win in four games with a 3–2 result.

Grimsby was the destination the following weekend. The match ended in a 2–2 draw.

Blackpool took on Leicester Fosse on 27 February, and ran out 3–0 winners.

Into March, and an away game against Small Heath. Blackpool won 3–1.

A third consecutive victory followed on 13 March — 4–1 at home to Newcastle United.

The Seasiders' good form ended in the following game, a 3–1 defeat at Notts County.

On 27 March, Blackpool returned to winning ways when Loughborough travelled to Raikes Hall. The hosts won 4–1.

Two days later, Blackpool travelled to Burton Wanderers and lost 3–1.

Two more defeats ensued: 2–0 at Gainsborough Trinity, and the same scoreline at Walsall.

Seven months after they met in East Lancashire, on 16 April Darwen travelled west to the coast. Jack Parkinson's strike gave Blackpool both points.

A 3–0 home victory over Burton Swifts ensued, before the final game of the season saw Gainsborough Trinity visit the seaside for a 1–1 draw.

Three players appeared in each of Blackpool's 30 matches: Douglas, Bowman and Norris.

First-team squad

Competitions

Overall record

Football League Second Division

League table

Results

In summary

By matchday

In detail

FA Cup

Squad statistics

Appearances and goals

Players used: 21
Goals scored: 65 (including 0 own-goals)

Goalscorers

Clean sheets

Transfers

Transfers out

Notes

References

General
Books

Websites

Specific

Blackpool
Blackpool F.C. seasons